Fiona Roberts is a former association football player who represented New Zealand at international level.

Roberts made her Football Ferns début in a 0–3 loss to Ghana on 26 August 1994, and her second appearance was in a 0–1 loss to Russia 2 days later.

References

Year of birth missing (living people)
Living people
New Zealand women's international footballers
New Zealand women's association footballers
Women's association footballers not categorized by position